Mexicana de Aviación Flight 940, operated by Mexicana de Aviación, was a scheduled international flight from Mexico City - Puerto Vallarta - Mazatlán - Los Angeles on March 31, 1986, utilizing a Boeing 727-200 registered as XA-MEM, when the plane crashed into El Carbón, a mountain in the Sierra Madre Occidental mountain range northwest of Mexico City, killing everyone on board.  With 167 deaths, the crash of Flight 940 is the deadliest aviation disaster ever to occur on Mexican soil, and the deadliest involving a Boeing 727.

Background
The aircraft involved was delivered to Mexicana in 1981 and was named "Veracruz". The plane was piloted by Captain Carlos Guadarrama Sistos, an experienced Mexican captain with over 15,000 hours of flying experience. The first officer was Philip L. Piaget Rhorer, and the flight engineer was Ángel Carlos Peñasco Espinoza. The crew of eight included five flight attendants. The wife of the captain, who was a retired flight attendant, and the captain's son and daughter were also among the 159 passengers on board. At 08:50 local time, the plane took off from Benito Juárez International Airport en route to Los Angeles International Airport with scheduled stopovers in Puerto Vallarta and Mazatlán. The plane carried 147 passengers (139 passengers and 8 crew members) from Mexico, 8 from France, 6 from the United States, 4 from Sweden, and 2 from Canada.

Crash
At 09:05, fifteen minutes after takeoff, an explosion rocked the fuselage. Captain Guadarrama and the crew in the cockpit, realizing that the plane was shaking too much, declared an emergency and asked to return to Benito Juárez International Airport for an emergency landing. The airport was prepared for the landing. However, the aircraft crashed into El Carbón mountain near the town of Maravatío, Michoacán, broke in two and burst into flames. All 167 passengers and crew were killed upon impact. Among the dead were two film scouts for the horror film Predator. Eyewitnesses reported details of the crash to authorities. The local police and the Mexican army were dispatched to the crash site.

Investigation
Initially, two Middle Eastern terrorist groups claimed responsibility for this crash, along with the bombing of TWA Flight 840, which occurred just two days later. An anonymous letter signed by those groups claimed that a suicide mission had sabotaged the plane in retaliation against the United States. However, sabotage was later dismissed as a cause of the crash. The investigations were carried out by the U.S. National Transportation Safety Board and Mexican aeronautical authorities, who found that the cause of the accident was that a LH main landing gear tire was filled with compressed air, instead of nitrogen. In addition, the tire had some marks of overheating. The investigators later found that the overheating was caused by a malfunctioning brake on the landing gear.

Aftermath
Mexicana maintenance personnel were blamed for negligence in maintaining the 727 and for filling the tire with compressed air, instead of nitrogen. About a year after the crash, the U.S. FAA released an Airworthiness Directive  requiring the use of dry nitrogen (or other gases shown to be inert) when filling the tires on braked wheels of most commercial airliners. The crash remains the deadliest airline disaster in Mexican history and is the world's deadliest air disaster involving the Boeing 727. The cause of the in-flight fire is believed to be the rupture of fuel lines by the exploding tire.

See also

Nigeria Airways Flight 2120 - A similar crash where under-inflated tyres overheated and started a fire onboard which destroyed vital hydraulic and control cables leading to a loss of control
Air France Flight 4590 -  A 2000 Concorde crash caused by an inflight fire triggered by tire burst on takeoff
Swissair Flight 306 - A 1963 crash caused by an inflight fire triggered by a landing gear failure on takeoff
ValuJet Flight 592 - A 1996 crash caused by an inflight fire in the cargo hold
Propair Flight 420, another aircraft where a fire started in the left wheel well of a Fairchild Metroliner.

References

External links 

Planecrashinfo.com

Mexicana de Aviación accidents and incidents
Airliner accidents and incidents caused by maintenance errors
Aviation accidents and incidents in Mexico
Aviation accidents and incidents in 1986
1986 in Mexico
Accidents and incidents involving the Boeing 727
Airliner accidents and incidents caused by in-flight fires
March 1986 events in Mexico
Mexico City International Airport